The 1991 UMass Minutemen football team represented the University of Massachusetts Amherst in the 1991 NCAA Division I-AA football season as a member of the Yankee Conference. The team was coached by Jim Reid and played its home games at Warren McGuirk Alumni Stadium in Hadley, Massachusetts. The 1991 season was Reid's last as head coach of the Minutemen. UMass finished the season with a record of 4–7 overall and 3–5 in conference play.

Schedule

References

UMass
UMass Minutemen football seasons
UMass Minutemen football